Maupasia is a genus of polychaete worms.

The name is a tribute to French librarian, zoologist and botanist Émile Maupas (1842–1916).

References

External links 

 Maupasia at the World Register of Marine Species (WoRMS)

Phyllodocida
Polychaete genera